The Jackal and the Spring (French: Le chacal et la source) is an African fairy tale collected by E. Jacottet in Contes Populaires des Bassoutos.

Synopsis

All the rivers and streams ran dry.  The animals dug a well to keep from dying, but the jackal did not help.  They set a guard to keep the jackal from drinking.  The first, a rabbit, kept off the jackal until it bribed it with some honeycomb to let it tie it up; then the jackal drank its full.  The second, a hare, met the same fate.  The third, the tortoise, did not answer the jackal, so it thought it could kick it aside, but the tortoise grabbed its leg and never let it go.  The jackal did not manage to free itself until the other animals appeared; then it managed to wrench itself free and flee without drinking.

Translations
Jacouttet's work was translated into English, with this tale being named The Jackal. Its title in the original language was given as Phokojoe.

Andrew Lang included the tale in The Grey Fairy Book with the name The Jackal and the Spring.

Analysis
Édouard Jacouttet stated that the tale was very popular in South Africa and found "on the Zambezi, at Delagoa Bay and among the Ba-Sumbwa". He also notices that the hare replaces the jackal as the cunning character.

References

External links
The Jackal and the Spring

Jackal and the Spring